The 2015 Georgia Southern Eagles football team represented Georgia Southern University in the 2015 NCAA Division I FBS football season. They were led by second-year head coach Willie Fritz and played their home games at Paulson Stadium in Statesboro, Georgia. This season was the Eagles second season in the Sun Belt Conference and the first season for full bowl eligibility. The Eagles finished the regular season 8–4, 6–2 in Sun Belt play to finish in third place. In the Eagles' first ever bowl appearance, the Eagles defeated Bowling Green, 58–27, in the GoDaddy Bowl.

On December 12, head coach Willie Fritz resigned to become the head coach at Tulane. The Eagles were led by assistant head coach and running backs coach Dell McGee in the GoDaddy Bowl.

Schedule
Georgia Southern announced their 2015 football schedule on February 27, 2015. The 2015 schedule consists of six home and away games in the regular season. The Eagles hosted Sun Belt foes Georgia State, New Mexico State, Texas State, and South Alabama, and  traveled to Appalachian State, Idaho, Louisiana–Monroe, and Troy.

'

Game summaries

@ West Virginia

Western Michigan

The Citadel

@ Idaho

@ Louisiana–Monroe

In their fifth game of the season, the Eagles won, 51–31 over the Louisiana–Monroe Warhawks.

New Mexico State

@ Appalachian State

Texas State

@ Troy

@ Georgia

South Alabama

Georgia State

Bowling Green–GoDaddy Bowl

References

Georgia Southern
Georgia Southern Eagles football seasons
LendingTree Bowl champion seasons
Georgia Southern Eagles football